During the First World War, 259 infantry brigades were raised by the British Army, two by the Royal Navy, and one from the Royal Marines. Of these brigades, fifty-three were held in reserve or only used for training, while another nine only served in British India.

The pre war regular army only had eighteen infantry brigades, with another forty-five serving with the reserve Territorial Force (TF). Once war was declared, the regular army was expanded first by volunteers and then conscripts for what became known as Kitchener's Army. At the same time, volunteers for the TF formed second line formations.

Three infantry brigades served with a division, mostly the same one throughout the war, but some did serve for short periods with another division. At the start of the war, four infantry battalions along with a small headquarters formed a brigade; but, by 1918, with the number of casualties mounting, the brigade was reduced to three battalions. During the same time, the firepower of a brigade was increased by the assignment of more machine guns. Eventually, as the war progressed, a brigade had its own machine gun company and a trench mortar battery assigned.

Background

At the outbreak of the war in August 1914, the British regular army was a small professional force. It consisted of 247,432 regular troops organised into four Guards, 69 line infantry and 31 cavalry regiments, along with artillery and other support arms. The regular Army was supported by the Territorial Force, and by reservists. In August 1914, there were three forms of reserves. The Army Reserve of retired soldiers was 145,350 strong. The Special Reserve had another 64,000 men and was a form of part-time soldiering, similar to the Territorial Force. The National Reserve had some 215,000 men, who were on a register which was maintained by Territorial Force County Associations; these men had military experience, but no other reserve obligation. The regulars and reserves—at least on paper—totalled a mobilised force of almost 700,000 men, although only 150,000 men were immediately available to be formed into the British Expeditionary Force.

Pre war regular army
After 1907, the regular British Army, serving at home, was grouped into six divisions, each of three brigades numbered 1st–18th. Following the declaration of war, four infantry battalions, which had been intended to defend the lines of communication, were brigaded together as the 19th Brigade. Near the end of 1914, when regular army battalions returned to Europe from serving around the British Empire, they formed the 7th and 8th Division, with the 20th–25th brigades. As the war progressed, three more regular army divisions were formed the 27th, 28th and 29th, with their brigades being numbered from 80th–88th.

Territorial Force
The reserve formations of the Territorial Force comprised fourteen divisions, each of three brigades, while another three brigades were independent formations intended for coastal defence. They were unnumbered until August 1915, and took the name of the region with which they were affiliated, or the name of the regiments that supplied their battalions. When the brigades were given numbers, they became the 125th–234th brigades. As a home defence organisation, their men could not be sent overseas against their wishes. After war was declared, almost to a man the Territorial Force volunteered to serve overseas, so a second line Territorial Force was recruited, virtually a mirror image of the first line divisions and brigades. For example, the Northumbrian Division, had the Northumberland, York and Durham and the Durham Light Infantry Brigades. The second line 2nd Northumbrian Division, had the 2nd Northumberland, 2nd York and Durham and the 2nd Durham Light Infantry Brigades. Volunteers for the second line Territorial Force had the same terms and conditions as the first line, and could not be sent overseas unless they agreed to do so.

Kitchener's Army

The third part of the British Army was the New Army, also known as Kitchener's Army. Recruits for the New Armies were technically part of the regular army, serving for three years or until the end of the war. The first of the New Armies comprised the 9th–14th divisions, with the 26th–43rd brigades. The second New Army comprised the 15th–20th divisions, with the 44th–61st brigades. The third comprised the 21st–26th divisions, with the 62nd–79th brigades. The fourth and fifth were the Pals battalions of the 30th–35th divisions, with the 89th–106th brigades and the 37th–42nd divisions, with the 110th–136th brigades. The last New Army was the sixth, comprising the 36th–41st divisions, with the 107th–124th brigades.

Infantry brigade composition
At the start of the First World War French, Russian and German divisions consisted of two brigades each of which were made up of two regiments. Each regiment had three battalions, except the Russians which had four, which meant that in total there were around 6,000 men in the brigade. The British Army was different. Its divisions consisted of three brigades, with each brigade having slightly over 4,000 men in four battalions, plus support troops, under the command of a brigadier general.

The 1914 British infantry brigade comprised a small headquarters and four infantry battalions, with two heavy machine guns per battalion. Over the course of the war, the composition of the infantry brigades gradually changed, and there was an increased emphasis upon providing them with their own organic fire support. By 1916, each brigade had a Vickers machine gun company and a mortar battery with eight Stokes Mortars. The machine gun companies were later withdrawn and combined into a divisional machine gun battalion. By 1918, the brigade formation had been reduced to three battalions. However, each battalion now had thirty-six Lewis machine guns, making a total of 108 in the brigade.

Several brigades that served away from the Western Front and other main theatres of operations, had a different composition. The 228th Brigade, which served with the command of the Greek Crete Division, had a Royal Engineers signal section and a Royal Army Medical Corps field ambulance attached. Other brigades that served in the British Salonika Army, had a Section Ammunition Column attached. Brigades that served in the Mesopotamia Campaign had their own supply and transport columns of the Army Service Corps. One brigade, the 226th Mixed, was unique in the respect that it was the only infantry brigade with its own artillery, having two batteries from the Royal Garrison Artillery assigned.

In the trench warfare on the Western Front, an infantry brigade's defensive responsibilities depended upon where they were at the time. The forty-two brigades, fourteen divisions, of the First Army had to defend . The thirty-six brigades, twelve divisions, of the Second Army . The forty-two brigades, fourteen divisions, of the Third Army .

Within the brigade a typical deployment was one battalion in the front line, with the other two in reserve, about  back. The forward battalion had several sections manning outposts in the front trench with two companies manning strong points behind them. The third company was in reserve to act as a counter-attacking force and the fourth company was resting. Two brigades of a division would be deployed forward with the third brigade in reserve.

List of brigades

See also
 British Army during World War I
 British Army First World War reserve brigades
 British Army uniform and equipment in World War I
 British Expeditionary Force order of battle (1914)
 British Expeditionary Force (World War I)
 List of British divisions in World War I
 List of British brigades of the Second World War
 Recruitment to the British Army during the First World War

Notes
Footnotes

Citations

Bibliography

 Becke, Maj A.F., History of the Great War: Order of Battle of Divisions, Part 1: The Regular British Divisions, London: HM Stationery Office, 1934/Uckfield: Naval & Military Press, 2007, .
 Becke, Maj A.F., History of the Great War: Order of Battle of Divisions, Part 2b: The 2nd-Line Territorial Force Divisions (57th–69th), with the Home-Service Divisions (71st–73rd) and 74th and 75th Divisions, London: HM Stationery Office, 1937/Uckfield: Naval & Military Press, 2007, 
 Becke, Maj A.F., History of the Great War: Order of Battle of Divisions, Part 3a: New Army Divisions (9–26), London: HM Stationery Office, 1938/Uckfield: Naval & Military Press, 2007,

External links
The Regimental Warpath 1914–1918
The Long, Long Trail

 
British Army in World War I
Military units and formations of the United Kingdom in World War I
Lists of British Army units and formations